Kawasaki, Kanagawa held a mayoral election on October 23, 2005. Incumbent Takao Abe, backed by Liberal Democratic Party and the New Komeito Party won the election.

Results

Sources 
 Results from JanJan
 Article from Japan Policy & Politics

Kawasaki, Kanagawa
2005 elections in Japan
Mayoral elections in Japan
October 2005 events in Japan